Samantha Arsenault (born October 11, 1981), later known by her married name Samantha Livingstone, is an American former competition swimmer and Olympic champion. 
Arsenault represented the United States at the 2000 Olympic Games in Sydney, Australia, where she received a gold medal as a member of the winning U.S. team in the women's 4×200-meter freestyle relay, together with teammates Diana Munz, Lindsay Benko and Jenny Thompson.  The four Americans set a new Olympic record in the event final of 7:57.80.

Arsenault was born in Peabody, Massachusetts and graduated from Gardner High School.  She swam for North Shore Swim Club and Greenwood Memorial Swim Club in Gardner, Massachusetts.  She initially attended the University of Michigan, and swam for the Michigan Wolverines swimming and diving team.  She transferred to the University of Georgia after her freshman year, and finished her college sports career competing for coach Jack Bauerle's Georgia Bulldogs swimming and diving team.

See also
 List of Olympic medalists in swimming (women)
 List of University of Georgia people

References

External links

1981 births
Living people
American female freestyle swimmers
Georgia Bulldogs women's swimmers
Michigan Wolverines women's swimmers
Olympic gold medalists for the United States in swimming
People from Gardner, Massachusetts
Sportspeople from Worcester County, Massachusetts
Swimmers at the 2000 Summer Olympics
Medalists at the 2000 Summer Olympics